John Pimlott may refer to:

 John Pimlott (footballer), English footballer
 John Pimlott (historian), British military historian